Archibald "Sue, Soo" McLean (March 10, 1889 – August 21, 1960) was a Canadian professional ice hockey player. McLean played in the 1910s in the early years of professional hockey. He played defence with the Winnipeg Monarchs, New Westminster Royals and Toronto Blueshirts. He was released by the Blueshirts on December 5, 1913.

Statistics

References
Archie McLean at JustSportsStats
 

Notes

Canadian ice hockey defencemen
Ice hockey people from Ontario
New Westminster Royals players
Toronto Blueshirts players
Winnipeg Monarchs players
People from Bracebridge, Ontario
1889 births
1960 deaths